Lamprolepis is a genus of lizards, known commonly as emerald skinks, in the subfamily Lygosominae of the family Scincidae. Lygosoma is its closest genetic relative.

Geographic range
Species of the genus Lamprolepis are found in Indonesia and Malaysia, and on islands in the western Pacific.

Species
Today, three species are recognized as being valid.

The two Phantom Skink species,  Tristiidon Lunata and Tristiidon Sol Were once classed here, but now has its own Genus.

Lamprolepis leucosticta  – white-spotted tree skink
Lamprolepis nieuwenhuisii  – Nieuwenhuis's skink
Lamprolepis smaragdina  – emerald tree skink, green tree skink

Nota bene: A binomial authority in parentheses indicates that the species was originally described in a genus other than Lamprolepis.

References

dices. (Lamprolepis, new genus, p. 22). (in Latin).

 
Lizard genera
Taxa named by Leopold Fitzinger